As of September 2016, the International Union for Conservation of Nature (IUCN) lists 3117 least concern mammalian species. 56% of all evaluated mammalian species are listed as least concern. 
The IUCN also lists 127 mammalian subspecies as least concern.

Of the subpopulations of mammals evaluated by the IUCN, one species subpopulation has been assessed as least concern.

This is a complete list of least concern mammalian species and subspecies evaluated by the IUCN. Species and subspecies which have least concern subpopulations (or stocks) are indicated. Where possible common names for taxa are given while links point to the scientific name used by the IUCN.

Primates 
There are 115 species and 96 subspecies of primate assessed as least concern.

Lemurs

Old World monkeys 

Species

Subspecies

New World monkeys 
There are 60 species and 39 subspecies of New World monkey assessed as least concern.

Atelids 

Species

Subspecies
 Golden-mantled howler
 Juruá red howler monkey
 Colombian red howler monkey

Cebids 

Species

Subspecies

Pitheciids

Callitrichids 

Species

Subspecies

Night monkeys 

Species

Subspecies
 Aotus azarae azarae
 Bolivian night monkey

Lorisoidea 
There are 21 species and 15 subspecies in Lorisoidea assessed as least concern.

Lorisids 

Species

Subspecies
 Bosman's potto

Galagos 

Species

Subspecies

Hominidae 

Species

Cetartiodactyls 
Cetartiodactyla includes dolphins, whales and even-toed ungulates. There are 118 species and 15 subspecies of cetartiodactyl assessed as least concern.

Non-cetacean even-toed ungulates 
There are 96 species and 15 subspecies of non-cetacean even-toed ungulate assessed as least concern.

Suids

Deer species 

Subspecies

Bovids 

Species

Subspecies

Chevrotains

Other non-cetacean even-toed ungulate species

Cetaceans

Marsupials 
There are 192 marsupial species assessed as least concern.

Peramelemorphia

Diprotodontia 
There are 65 species in the order Diprotodontia assessed as least concern.

Macropodids

Petaurids

Phalangerids

Pseudocheirids

Other Diprotodontia species

Shrew opossums 
 Dusky caenolestid
 Incan caenolestid

Dasyuromorphia

Dasyurids

Opossums

Marsupial moles 
 Northern marsupial mole
 Southern marsupial mole

Carnivora 
There are 175 species, 14 subspecies, and one subpopulation in the order Carnivora assessed as least concern.

Felids

Eared seals 

Species

Subspecies

Viverrids

Earless seals 

Species

Subspecies

Subpopulations
 Grey seal (1 subpopulation)

Canids 

Subspecies

Mustelids

Procyonids

Skunks

Mongooses

Other Carnivora species 

Subspecies

Afrosoricida 
Afrosoricida includes tenrecs and golden moles. There are 32 species in the order Afrosoricida assessed as least concern.

Golden moles

Tenrecs

Pilosa

Eulipotyphla 
There are 271 species in the order Eulipotyphla assessed as least concern.

Shrews

Erinaceids

Talpids

Lagomorpha 
Lagomorpha comprises rabbits and relatives. There are 59 species in the order Lagomorpha assessed as least concern.

Leporids

Pikas

Rodents 
There are 1399 species and two subspecies of rodent assessed as least concern.

Hystricomorpha 
There are 132 species in Hystricomorpha assessed as least concern.

Octodontids

Tuco-tucos

Dasyproctids

Neotropical spiny rat species

Caviids

Blesmols

New World porcupines

Old World porcupines

Other Hystricomorpha species

Myomorpha 
There are 981 species in Myomorpha assessed as least concern.

Platacanthomyids 
 Chinese pygmy dormouse

Murids

Cricetids

Nesomyids

Spalacids

Dipodids

Mouse-like hamsters

Castorimorpha 
There are 79 species and two subspecies in Castorimorpha assessed as least concern.

Heteromyids

Gophers 

Species

Subspecies
 Nicaraguan pocket gopher
 Thaeler's pocket gopher

Castorids 
 North American beaver
 Eurasian beaver

Sciuromorpha 
There are 199 species in Sciuromorpha assessed as least concern.

Sciurids

Dormice

Aplodontiids 
 Mountain beaver

Anomaluromorpha

Cingulata

Bats 
There are 695 bat species assessed as least concern.

Megabats

Microbats 
There are 609 microbat species assessed as least concern.

Old World leaf-nosed bats

Horseshoe bats

Vesper bats

Long-fingered bats

Sac-winged bats

Free-tailed bats

Mormoopids

Leaf-nosed bats

Slit-faced bats

Other microbat species

Elephant shrews

Treeshrews

Hyraxes

Other mammal species

See also 
 Lists of IUCN Red List least concern species
 List of near threatened mammals
 List of vulnerable mammals
 List of endangered mammals
 List of critically endangered mammals
 List of recently extinct mammals
 List of data deficient mammals

Notes

References 

Mammals
Least concern mammals
Least concern mammals